Shizuka is a Japanese given name.

Shizuka may also refer to:
 Shizuka (band), a Japanese rock band
 Shizuka (album), by Shizuka Kudo, 1988
 Shizuka (apple), a variety of Japanese apple

See also
"Shizuka na Hibi no Kaidan o", an LP recording by Dragon Ash, 2000